The John Tyndall Award is given to the "individual who has made pioneering, highly significant, or continuing technical or leadership contributions to fiber optics technology". The award is named after John Tyndall (1820-1893), who demonstrated for the first time internal reflection.

This award is sponsored and presented by both the IEEE Photonics Society (formerly called IEEE Lasers and Electro-Optics Society) and The Optical Society (OSA).

Recipients of this award will receive a special crystal sculpture that represents the concept of total internal reflection (endowed by Corning, Inc.), a scroll, and an honorarium.

Recipients 
Following people received the John Tyndall Award:

 2023 Ming-Jun Li
 2022 Meint Smit
 2021 Michal Lipson
 2020: Roel Baets
 2019: Kim Roberts
 2018: Peter J. Winzer
 2017: 
 2016: Alan H. Gnauck
 2015: 
 2014: Kazuro Kikuchi
 2013: James J. Coleman
 2012: John E. Bowers
 2011: David F. Welch
 2010: C. Randy Giles
 2009: Joe C. Campbell
 2008: Robert W. Tkach
 2007: Emmanuel Desurvire
 2006: 
 2005: 
 2004: Larry A. Coldren
 2003: Andrew Chraplyvy
 2002: Neal S. Bergano
 2001: Tatsuo Izawa
 2000: Stewart Personick
 1999: John B. MacChesney
 1998: 
 1997: 
 1996: Kenneth O. Hill
 1995: Tingye Li
 1994: 
 1993: Yasuharu Suematsu
 1992: Donald B. Keck
 1991: David N. Payne
 1990: Thomas G. Giallorenzi
 1989: Stewart E. Miller
 1988: Michael K. Barnoski
 1987: Robert D. Maurer

See also

 List of engineering awards
 List of physics awards

References 

Engineering awards
John Tyndall Award
Awards of Optica (society)